USNS Milford (T‑AG‑187) was one of 12 ships scheduled to be acquired by the United States Navy in February 1966 and converted into Forward Depot Ships and placed into service with the Military Sea Transport Service, The Greeley Victory (MCV‑714) was chosen for this conversion and assigned the name Milford but the program was canceled and the ships were not acquired by the Navy.

References

Victory ships
Ships built in Richmond, California
1945 ships
World War II merchant ships of the United States
Cancelled ships of the United States Navy